The Chapel of St. Roque, also known as the Chapel of Our Lady of Light, is a Roman Catholic chapel located in Mdina, Malta.

History
The original chapel building that stood on the site, of the present church, existed in 1393 under the dedication of the Holy Cross. However, the chapel was demolished in 1681 and another dedicated to Saint Roque was built in the 18th century. By time this chapel became known as Our Lady of Light, as a consequence after a painting depicting the Virgin of Light was installed in the chapel.

References

18th-century Roman Catholic church buildings in Malta
Roman Catholic chapels in Malta
Mdina
National Inventory of the Cultural Property of the Maltese Islands